Richland Historic District may refer to:

Richland Historic District (Richland, Georgia), listed on the National Register of Historic Places  (NRHP) in Stewart County
Richland Historic District (Richland, Michigan), NRHP-listed in Kalamazoo County
Richland-West End Historic District, Nashville, Tennessee, NRHP-listed in Davidson County, Tennessee
Richland Center Archeological District, Richland Center, Wisconsin, NRHP-listed in Richland County

See also
Richlands Historic District (disambiguation)